CIHI-FM is a Canadian radio station broadcasting at 93.1 FM in Fredericton, New Brunswick owned by Stingray Group. The station uses its on-air brand name as Rewind 93.1 with a classic hits format. The station launched on June 24, 2013.

History
On May 11, 2012, Newcap received approval from the CRTC to operate a new English language FM radio station in Fredericton, New Brunswick at 93.1 FM.

A tourist information radio station, CIRC-FM, which is owned by Instant Information Services formerly operated at 93.3 FM which is an adjacent frequency to 93.1 FM. Following the approval of Newcap's application, CIRC, which had reportedly left the air in 2010, was directed to move to a new frequency.

On February 7, 2013, the CRTC approved Newcap's application to modify the technical parameters of CIHI by changing the class of its licence from B to C1, by decreasing the station's average effective radiated power (ERP) from 50,000 to 42,000 watts (and by increasing the maximum ERP from 50,000 to 100,000 watts), by decreasing the effective height of antenna above average terrain from 150.0 to 137.5 metres, by changing the radiation pattern of the antenna from non-directional to directional, and by relocating the antenna and transmitter from Hamtown Corner (the original site in the application), to Mount Hope.

CIHI first launched on June 24, 2013, as Up 93.1 with an adult hits format. The first song played on "Up!" was "Don't Stop" by Fleetwood Mac. On February 12, 2021, the station flipped to classic hits branded as Rewind 93.1.

References

Former Logo

External links
Rewind 93.1
www.ncc.ca - Newcap Inc.
 

IHI
IHI
IHI
Radio stations established in 2012
2012 establishments in New Brunswick